Sinezona danieldreieri is a species of minute sea snail, a marine gastropod mollusk or micromollusk in the family Scissurellidae, the little slit shells.

Description

Distribution
This marine species occurs off the Austral Islands, French Polynesia

References

 Geiger D.L. (2008). New species of scissurellids from the Austral Islands, French Polynesia, and the Indo-Malayan Archipelago (Gastropoda: Vetigastropoda: Scissurellidae, Anatomidae, Larocheidae). The Nautilus 122(4): 185-200

Scissurellidae
Gastropods described in 2008